Haltwhistle is a railway station on the Tyne Valley Line, which runs between  and  via . It is owned by Network Rail and managed by Northern Trains.

History
The Newcastle and Carlisle Railway was formed in 1829, and was opened in stages. The station was opened in June 1838, following the opening of the line between Greenhead and Haydon Bridge. The station is thought to be the work of the line's resident engineer, John Blackmore.

In 1852, the station became a junction, with the opening of the Newcastle and Carlisle Railway's branch line to Alston. Following the demise of the line and closure of the coal depot in the late 1970s, the track layout was simplified. The former bay platform remains, but without track.

Haltwhistle was reduced to an unstaffed halt in 1967, along with most of the other stations on the line that escaped the Beeching Axe. The station has retained its water tower, water crane, main buildings, signal box and original wooden shelters – several of which are Grade II listed.

The station's signal box, constructed in 1901 by the North Eastern Railway, was taken out of use in 1993, following re-signalling to colour lights.

As of October 2020, in a project led by the Tyne Valley Community Rail Partnership, work is underway to refurbish the station's former waiting room buildings – at a cost of £500,000. The project will see improved waiting areas for passengers, as well as new office and studio space.

During early 2021, the footbridge between the two platforms was refurbished.

Facilities
The station has two platforms, both of which have a ticket machine (which accepts card or contactless payment only), seating, waiting shelter, next train audio and visual displays and an emergency help point. There is step-free access to both platforms by road underbridge, with both platforms also being linked by a footbridge. There is a small car park at the station.

Haltwhistle is part of the Northern Trains penalty fare network, meaning that a valid ticket or promise to pay notice is required prior to boarding the train.

Services 

All services are operated by Northern Trains.

Rolling stock used: Class 156 Super Sprinter and Class 158 Express Sprinter

Alston Line 

Originally built to access the mines around Alston, the line never fulfilled its economic potential. It was originally marked for closure in the 1960s, under the Beeching plan, however the lack of an all-weather road kept it open. Following improvements to the road network in the 1970s, the station, along with the line, was closed on 3 May 1976 by the British Railways Board.

The track was lifted the following year, after a preservation attempt by the South Tynedale Railway Preservation Society proved to be unsuccessful. The society did eventually succeed in buying part of the line, with the South Tynedale Railway narrow-gauge heritage railway opening on 30 July 1983. 

The path of the branch line follows the Pennine Way for some of its route, and was mentioned by Alfred Wainwright in his Pennine Way Companion.

References

External links
 

Former North Eastern Railway (UK) stations
Railway stations in Northumberland
DfT Category F1 stations
Railway stations in Great Britain opened in 1838
Northern franchise railway stations
Haltwhistle